This is a list of notable people affiliated with the Arts et Métiers ParisTech. Alumni of the Arts et Métiers ParisTech are traditionally called Gadzarts.

Famous Gadzarts by field
"NH Prize" means that the person was awarded the Nessim Habif Prize.

Armament industry
Désiré Legat - Châlons, 1853: production of guns
Ingénieur Robin - Châlons, 1867: created the modern 75mm gun shell
Albert Oberhauser - Châlons, 1890: achieved the mass production of 100,000 rockets a day

Automotive industry
Émile Delahaye - Angers, 1859: first to use pumps for water circulation
Charles Trépardoux - Angers, 1868: first steam tricycle
Charles Brasier - Châlons, 1880: car with stiff frame and effective shock absorbers
Louis Delâge - Angers, 1890: luxury car maker
Louis Coatalen - Cluny, 1895: contributed to the famous "Liberty" engine that equipped the US Army trucks during World War I
Sébastien Iglesis - Aix, 1896
Henri Perrot - Châlons, 1899

Aviation
Alexandre Goupil - Angers, 1859: first helix for airplanes
Lucien Chauvière - Angers, 1891: known for aircraft propeller designs
Charles Cormont - Angers, 1895: built 40 dirigible balloons
Louis Béchereau - Angers, 1896: first airplane to reaches a speed of 200 km/h; creator of the famous World War I SPAD air fighter (Guynemer's Vieux Charles), 13,000 of which were built
Léon Lemartin - Aix-en-Provence, 1902: co-designer of the Gnome Omega rotary aero-engine, pioneer aviator for Bleriot, world record holder
Antoine Odier - Aix, 1909: created the Odier Vendôme biplane and constructed a twin-engined seaplane with ballcocks
René Couzinet - Angers, 1921: built his famous Arc-en-Ciel, which flew Paris to Buenos-Aires in 2 days and 15 hours
Pierre Nadot - Paris, 1924: first flight of the Caravelle
Georges Gutman - Cluny, 1943: creator of the EROS oxygen mask for civil aviation; inventor of a pneumatic harness for the fast use of the mask in flight; NH prize

Railway
Jean-Jacques Meyer - Châlons, 1823: a variable relaxation system for steam engines
Alexandre Desroches - Angers, 1829: railway in Russia
Edmond Roy - Angers, 1837: railway of the Andes
François Michel - Châlons, 1847: built the first sleepers, in Moscow, for the Saint Petersburg-Moscow line
Raymond Garde - Paris, 1939: one of the fathers of the High Speed Train (TGV)

Printing Industry
Charles Catala - Châlons, 1839: Manufacture of straw paper mass
Joseph Heusse - Châlons, 1842: enhancements of printing machines
Abel Boisseau - Angers, 1856: with Marioni, he created the rotary presses
Louis Moyroud - Cluny, 1933: NH Prize; with René Higonet, he invented the automatic photocomposition, in 1944; member of the American National Inventor Hall of Fame

Navy
Claude Goubet - Angers, 1843: first French submarine
Charles Marzari - Châlons, 1861 and Albert Dufont - Châlons, 1865: navy turrets
Joseph Barguillet - Angers, 1862: the first of a long line of Arts & Métiers general mechanics engineer; ranked as an admiral
Jules Tessier - some other person than the Canadian lawyer Jules Tessier - Angers, 1887: warships, the Gerfaut, the Terrible, world speed records

Mechanics - electricity
Henri Flaud - Angers 1830: fire pumps
Émile Lecoq - Châlons, 1839: specialist of printing and numbering machines
Lucien Arbel - Aix, 1843: metallurgy, machines
Amédée Buquet - Angers 1846: excavators for hard stones
Ignace Schabaver - Châlons, 1850: centrifugal pumps (see also Le Rialet)
Léandre Megy - Aix, 1851: lifting and handling, brakes
Émile Cail - Châlons, 1855: founded the Fives-Lille company
Eugène Daguin - Châlons, 1865: the Daguin stamping machine
René Guillery - Châlons, 1883: production control machines
Alphonse Pégard - Châlons, 1885: production machines
Claude Gambin - Châlons, 1900: milling machines
Henri Bruet - Lille, 1904: Cazeneuve lathes
Marius Lavet - Cluny, 1910: NH Prize; electric and electronic clocks (quartz watches)
Jean Dutheil - Aix, 1916: NH Prize; advanced techniques for metal made buildings
Pierre Bézier - Paris, 1927: NH Prize; machine tools for mass production (robots); inventor of computer aided design and Bézier curve
Raymond Pailloux - Châlons, 1927: developed the integrated circuit technique
Marcel Sédille - Paris, 1928: gas and steam turbines
Georges Henriot - Lille, 1938: kinematics of the gears

Textile industry
Frédéric Quinson - Aix, 1847: invented a woolcombing machine for silk scrap

Public infrastructures industry
Jean-Baptiste Monnier - Châlons, 1828: first sugar plant in the Nile valley
François Barbarin - Angers, 1844: Bizerte and Tabarka harbours, Gaza phosphates
Henri Diedrich - Angers, 1844: phosphates plant in Krourigba
Dominique Berjeaut - Aix, 1844: Danube navigation
Amédée Buquet - Angers, 1846: mechanical excavator for hard stone boring
Alponse Pellerin - Châlons, 1849 and Louis Pellerin - Angers, 1875: bridges, tunnels, deep water foundations
Ernest Fouquet - Châlons, 1849: Trotzki bridge on the Neva river in Petrograd
Louis Bret - Angers, 1852: viaducts in Cratellauk, Fiaccati
Vincent Dauzats - Angers, 1856: Suez, Panama and Corinth canals
Félix Faraud - Aix, 1862: close counselor of the Cambodia king, discovered many Khmer people monuments
Alfred Letort - Châlons, 1868: sugar plants, refineries in Egypt
Ernest Laigle - Châlons, 1871: Mexico city, Vera-Cruz bridge
Louis Viriot - Châlons, 1872: Tunis, Sousse and Sfax harbours
Léon Chagnaud - Châlons, 1881: subway under the Seine river, Rove tunnel, Eguzon stopping, Donzère-Mondragon plant
Charles Vieille - Châlons, 1912: water stopping on the Niger river in Sansanding
Nicolas Esquillan - Châlons, 1919: NH Prize; arch of the CNIT building, Tancarville Bridge, reinforced concrete in thin shells
Jean Roret - Paris, 1942: Saint-Nazaire, Nantes, Rouen and Sèvres bridges, Eiffel tower handing-over to the standards, building of the Maine-Montparnasse tower
Henri Delauze - Aix, 1946: NH Prize; very deep sea diving; founder and CEO of the Comex company

Miscellaneous (sorted by center of origin)

Compiègne
 Joseph Meifred - Compiègne-Châlons-en-Champagne, 1801: cornist, pedagogue, horn designer; studied at the Paris Conservatory; based the Society of Arts et Métiers alumni in 1846

Aix-en-Provence 
Henri Jus - Aix, 1847: geologist, master in the art of probing the ground; dedicated 44 years of his life to transforming the Sahara desert; by doing this, he saved the Oued Rihr oasis and created around 500 water sources, yielding a total of 250 000 m3/min; created many oases; named "ßou el Ma » (the father of water) by the Saharan people
 Henri Verneuil - Aix, 1940: NH Prize; French film maker

Angers
 Jacques Bonsergent - Angers, 1930: accidentally involved in a scuffle with German soldiers in 1940; arrested by mistake, he refused to denounce his companions; sentenced to death by a German military tribunal and became the first shot person in Paris, on December 23, 1940 at age 28; his name was given to a subway station in Paris in 1946

Châlons-en-Champagne
 Eugène Houdry - Châlons, 1908: dedicated his life to the development of oil processing techniques; invented several new processes and created 14 big catalytic cracking units; files more than 600 patents; thanks to the higher energetic power of his gasoline, Allied war planes proved superior to their opponents during World War II

Cluny
 Pierre Angénieux - Cluny, 1925: NH Prize; high quality camera and cinema lenses; built cameras for space flights; awarded the Gordon E. Sawyer Award

References

Arts et Métiers ParisTech
Paris-related lists